Bjarne Elgar Grottunn (August 9, 1893 – October 4, 1987) was an American lawyer and politician.

Grottunn was born in Minneapolis, Minnesota and was raised on a farm in Jackson County, Minnesota. He graduated from Windom High School in Windom, Minnesota and served in the United States Army during World War I. Grottunn received his law degree from University of Minnesota Law School in 1920 and was admitted to the Minnesota bar. He lived in Jackson, Minnesota with his wife and family. Grottunn served in the Minnesota Senate from 1947 to 1954 and was a Democrat. He died in Mesa, Arizona.

References

1893 births
1987 deaths
People from Jackson, Minnesota
Lawyers from Minneapolis
Politicians from Minneapolis
Military personnel from Minnesota
University of Minnesota Law School alumni
Democratic Party Minnesota state senators